Alan Eugene Norris (born August 15, 1935) is a Senior United States circuit judge of the United States Court of Appeals for the Sixth Circuit.

Education and career

Born in Columbus, Ohio, Norris received a Bachelor of Arts degree from Otterbein College in 1957, a Bachelor of Laws from New York University School of Law in 1960, and a Master of Laws from University of Virginia School of Law in 1986. He was a law clerk to Justice Kingsley A. Taft of the Supreme Court of Ohio from 1960 to 1961. Norris was in private practice in Columbus from 1961 to 1962, and in Westerville, Ohio from 1962 to 1980, also serving as a member of the Ohio House of Representatives from 1967 to 1980. He was an instructor at Otterbein College from 1976 to 1980. He was a Judge of the Ohio Court of Appeals, Tenth District from 1980 to 1986.

Federal judicial service

On April 22, 1986, Norris was nominated by President Ronald Reagan to a seat on the United States Court of Appeals for the Sixth Circuit vacated by Judge Leroy John Contie Jr. Norris was confirmed by the United States Senate on June 6, 1986, and received his commission on July 1, 1986. He assumed senior status on July 1, 2001.

References

Sources
 

1935 births
20th-century American judges
Judges of the Ohio District Courts of Appeals
Judges of the United States Court of Appeals for the Sixth Circuit
Living people
Republican Party members of the Ohio House of Representatives
New York University School of Law alumni
Otterbein University alumni
United States court of appeals judges appointed by Ronald Reagan
University of Virginia School of Law alumni